The pileus (also  or  in Latin) was a brimless felt cap worn in Ancient Greece, Etruria, Illyria (Pannonia), later also introduced in Ancient Rome. The pileus also appears on Apulian red-figure pottery.

The pilos together with the petasos were the most common types of hats in Archaic and Classical era (8th–4th century BC) Greece. In the 5th century BC, a bronze version began to appear in Ancient Greece and it became a popular infantry helmet. It occasionally had a horsehair crest. The Greek pilos resembled the Roman and Etruscan pileus, which were typically made of felt. The Greek  and Latin  were smaller versions, similar to a skullcap.

Similar caps were worn in later antiquity and the early medieval ages in various parts of Europe, as seen in Gallic and Frankish dress. The Albanian traditional felt cap, the plis, worn today in Albania, Kosovo and adjacent areas, originated from a similar felt cap worn by the ancient Illyrians. 

A pointed version called pileus cornutus served as a distinguishing sign for the Jewish people in the Holy Roman Empire for five centuries (12th–17th centuries).

Name
The word for the cap in antiquity was pil(l)eus or pilos, indicating a kind of felt. Greek πῖλος , Latin , Albanian , as well as Old High German  and Proto-Slavic *pьlstь are considered to come from a common Proto-Indo-European root meaning "felt".

History

Ancient Greece

Pilos hat
The pilos (Greek: πῖλος, felt) was a typical conical hat in Ancient Greece among travelers, workmen and sailors, though sometimes a low, broad-rimmed version was also preferred, known as petasos. It could be made of felt or leather. The pilos together with the petasos were the most common types of hats in Archaic and Classical era (8th - 4th century B.C) Greece.

Pilos caps often identify the mythical twins, or Dioscuri, Castor and Pollux, as represented in sculptures, bas-reliefs and on ancient ceramics. Their caps were supposedly the remnants of the egg from which they hatched. The pilos appears on votive figurines of boys at the sanctuary of the Cabeiri at Thebes, the Cabeirion.

In warfare, the pilos type helmet was often worn by the peltast light infantry, in conjunction with the exomis, but it was also worn by the heavy infantry.

In various artistic depictions in the middle Byzantine period soldiers are seen wearing pilos caps.

Pilos helmet
From the 5th century B.C the Greeks developed the pilos helmet which derived from the hat of the same name. This helmet was made of bronze in the same shape as the pilos which was presumably sometimes worn under the helmet for comfort, giving rise to the helmet's conical shape. Some historians theorize that the pilos helmet had widespread adoption in some Greek cities such as Sparta, however, there is no primary historical source or any archeological evidence that would suggest that Sparta or any other Greek state would have used the helmet in a standardized fashion for their armies. What led historians to believe that the helmet was widespread in places such as Sparta was, amongst other reasons, the supposed advancement of battlefield tactics that required that infantry have full vision and mobility. However, many other types of Greek helmet offered similar designs to the pilos when it came to visibility, such as the konos or the chalcidian helmets.

Etruria
Being of Greek origin the Pilos helmet was worn in the late Etruscan Period by the local armies in the region.

Illyria
A so-called "Illyrian cap" was also known as "Panonian pileus" in the period of the Tetrarchy. As such during the period of the Emperor-soldiers the influences of the Illyrian provinces of the Roman Empire were evident, such as the wide use of the Pannonian pileus.

The Albanian traditional felt cap (cognate of pilos and pileus) originated from a similar felt cap worn by the Illyrians. The 1542 Latin dictionary  equated an Albanian hat with a kyrbasia, and described it as a "tall pileus [hat] in the shape of a cone".

An Illyrian wearing a pileus has been hesitantly identified on a Roman frieze from Tilurium in Dalmatia; the monument could be part of a trophy base erected by the Romans after the Great Illyrian Revolt (6–9 BCE).

A cylindrical flat-topped felt cap made of fur or leather originated in Pannonia, and came to be known as the Pannonian cap (pileus pannonicus).

Rome

The Roman pileus resembled the Greek pilos and was often made of felt. In Ancient Rome, a slave was freed in a ceremony in which a praetor touched the slave with a rod called a vindicta and pronounced him to be free. The slave's head was shaved and a pileus was placed upon it. Both the vindicta and the cap were considered symbols of Libertas, the goddess representing liberty. This was a form of extra-legal manumission (the manumissio minus justa) considered less legally sound than manumission in a court of law.

One 19th-century dictionary of classical antiquity states that, "Among the Romans the cap of felt was the emblem of liberty. When a slave obtained his freedom he had his head shaved, and wore instead of his hair an undyed pileus." Hence the phrase servos ad pileum vocare is a summons to liberty, by which slaves were frequently called upon to take up arms with a promise of liberty (Liv. XXIV.32). The figure of Liberty on some of the coins of Antoninus Pius, struck A.D. 145, holds this cap in the right hand.

In the period of the Tetrarchy, the Pannonian cap (pileus pannonicus) was adopted as the main military cap of the Roman army, until the 6th century AD; it was worn by lightly armed or off-duty soldiers, as well as workmen. It often appears in Roman artwork, in particular mosaics, from the late 3rd century AD. The earliest preserved specimen of the hat was found at the Roman quarry of Mons Claudianus, in the eastern desert of Egypt, and is dated to 100–120 AD; it has a dark-green color, and looks like a low fez or pillbox hat.

Later periods and variants
Similar caps were worn in later antiquity and the early medieval ages in various parts of Europe, as seen in Gallic and Frankish dress, in particular of the Merovingian and Carolingian era.

Gallery

See also
 Phrygian cap
 Attic helmet
 Barbute
 Boar's tusk helmet
 Boeotian helmet
 Kegelhelm
 Zucchetto

References

Citations

Bibliography

Further reading
Sekunda, Nicholas and Hook, Adam (2000). Greek Hoplite 480–323 BC. Osprey Publishing.

External links
Institute of France – Greek Costume (PDF in French)
Antiquitas – Casque corinthien et pilos
A Brief History of Greek Helmets by Jesse Obert – AncientPlanet Online Journal Vol. 2 (2012), 48 – 59
  "similar to the pileus or pileolus (skull-cap)"

Roman-era clothing
Symbols
Society of ancient Rome
Greek clothing
Illyrian clothing
Caps
Liberty symbols
Ancient Greek helmets
Pointed hats